Aaron Lee Northcraft (born May 28, 1990) is an American professional baseball pitcher who is currently a free agent. After spending time on the Atlanta Braves’ 40-man roster in 2013 and 2014, Northcraft made his Major League Baseball (MLB) debut in 2021 for the San Diego Padres.

Career

Atlanta Braves
Northcraft was drafted in the 10th round, of the 2009 Major League Baseball draft, 298th overall by the Atlanta Braves out of Mater Dei High School. He made his professional debut in 2009 with the GCL Braves. He split the 2010 season between the Rookie Ball Danville Braves and the Single-A Rome Braves, recording a cumulative 3.90 ERA and 7–4 record with 46 strikeouts. The next year, Northcraft spent the season in Rome, registering a 7–8 record and 3.34 ERA with 88 strikeouts in 113.1 innings pitched. He spent the 2012 season with the High-A Lynchburg Hillcats, pitching to a 10–11 record and 3.98 ERA in 151.2 innings of work. On November 19, 2012, Northcraft was selected to the 40-man roster. In 2013, Northcraft spent the season with the Double-A Mississippi Braves, registering a 8–8 record and 3.42 ERA. The next year, he split the year with Mississippi and the Triple-A Gwinnett Braves, pitching to a 7–10 record and 4.70 ERA.

San Diego Padres
On December 19, 2014, Northcraft was traded to the San Diego Padres along with Justin Upton in exchange for Jace Peterson, Max Fried, Dustin Peterson, and Mallex Smith. On February 11, 2015, Northcraft was designated for assignment by the Padres following the signing of James Shields. On February 17, Northcraft was outrighted to the Triple-A El Paso Chihuahuas. He split the season between El Paso and the Double-A San Antonio Missions, recording a 4–6 record and 4.21 ERA in 39 games. He split 2016 between El Paso and San Antonio, pitching to a 7–3 record and 4.07 ERA in 90.2 innings of work. On November 7, 2016, Northcraft elected free agency.

Northcraft spent the 2017 and 2018 seasons out of baseball due to injuries, missing 2017 with a partially torn flexor and UCL and missing 2018 after undergoing a January surgery to repair nerve damage in his right elbow. He appeared in 17 games for the Tigres de Aragua in the Venezuelan Winter League for the 2018/2019 season, pitching to a 1.53 ERA in 17.2 innings pitched.

Seattle Mariners
On January 2, 2019, Northcraft signed a minor league contract with the Seattle Mariners organization. He spent the majority of the season with the Triple-A Tacoma Rainiers, also appearing in 1 game for the Low-A Everett AquaSox and 3 games for the Double-A Arkansas Travelers, recording a cumulative 2.03 ERA with 39 strikeouts between the three clubs. On November 4, 2019, he elected free agency.

Miami Marlins
On December 18, 2019, Northcraft signed a minor league contract with the Miami Marlins organization that included an invitation to Spring Training. Northcraft was included in the Marlins initial 60-man player pool for the 2020 season. He spent the season at the alternate site and elected free agency on November 2, 2020.

San Diego Padres (second stint)
On February 12, 2021, Northcraft signed a minor league contract with the San Diego Padres organization that included an invitation to Spring Training. He was assigned to the Triple-A El Paso Chihuahuas to begin the year. He was selected to the active roster on April 23, 2021 and promoted to the major leagues for the first time. He made his MLB debut the next day, pitching in relief against the Los Angeles Dodgers. In the game, he also notched his first major league strikeout, punching out Dodgers outfielder Luke Raley. Northcraft recorded a 2.25 ERA in 5 appearances, walking 8 and striking out 5 before being designated for assignment on July 9. He was released on July 13, and resigned a minor league contract on July 19, 2021. He was released on August 10, 2022.

References

External links

Living people
1990 births
Baseball players from Tucson, Arizona
Major League Baseball pitchers
San Diego Padres players
Gulf Coast Braves players
Danville Braves players
Rome Braves players
Lynchburg Hillcats players
Mississippi Braves players
Scottsdale Scorpions players
Gwinnett Braves players
Peoria Javelinas players
San Antonio Missions players
El Paso Chihuahuas players
Tigres de Aragua players
American expatriate baseball players in Venezuela
Everett AquaSox players
Arkansas Travelers players
Tacoma Rainiers players
Gigantes del Cibao players
American expatriate baseball players in the Dominican Republic